Panizo is a surname. Notable people with the surname include:

Arnaldo Panizo (1839–1892), Peruvian general
Daniel Calvo Panizo (born 1979), Spanish footballer
Gregolry Panizo (born 1985), Brazilian road bicycle racer
José Luis Panizo (1922–1990), Spanish footballer
José Panizo (wrestler) (born 1936), Spanish wrestler